Jingdu may refer to:

Sima Bao (294–320), courtesy name Jingdu, Jin Dynasty prince
 or "inspector", a police rank in China

Places
Jingdu, one of the former official names of Beijing, used from 1918 to 1928
Jingdu, a Chinese exonym for the city of Kyoto, Japan
Jingdu, Chaonan, a town in Chaonan District, Shantou, Guangdong, China

See also
Du Jing (born 1984), Chinese badminton player